Nick Hounsfield is a British surfer, social entrepreneur, founder and chief visionary officer of The Wave, the first inland surfing destination in Bristol. Hounsfield has a particular interest in surfing and ‘blue health’ (linked to wellbeing through contact with water), adaptive and para surfing, and policy-shaping and development. He is a member of the UK Sport International Leadership Programme and as a Director of Surfing England oversees surfing’s first funding from UK Sport.

Background 
Nick Hounsfield was introduced to surfing by his father Brian - an osteopath and sailor - in the mid 1970s on regular visits to Cornwall, and has been an avid surfer ever since. Hounsfield graduated as an osteopath in 1997 with a BSc (Hons) from the British School of Osteopathy and was founder and clinical director of The Family Practice, Bristol with his wife, Juliana Hounsfield. In 2009, Hounsfield became a Council Member on the healthcare regulator the General Osteopathic Council.

After his father died, Hounsfield began to think about open spaces connected to nature where activity and socialisation across generations would be encouraged and embraced. He started talking with environmental activist, lobbyist and long-time surfer Chris Hines, a founding member of the environmental action group Surfers Against Sewage and former sustainability director at the Eden Project. Hounsfield and Hines researched how they could replicate the power of open ocean surfing to deliver a safe, sustainable inland surfing destination for people of all ages, backgrounds and abilities. Hounsfield saw surfing as a tool to start having conversations about wellbeing and was driven to make a social impact through a project improving the quality of health in communities in green and blue outdoor spaces that could both educate and rehabilitate.

Career 
Hounsfield founded The Wave in 2012 with sustainability at the heart and the aim to bring year-round consistent surfing and its benefits to a safe inland environment for both beginners and experts, starting with Bristol. Hounsfield partnered with business directors Craig Stoddart and Nick Asheshov, and campaigned to raise attention, funds, land and technology for the project. The Wave undertook research through a public information and accountability framework to explore the viability of both Wave Loch and Wavegarden technology, ultimately choosing to partner with Wavegarden. They raised £26 million through investment and secured site planning in 2014 (and 2017 for further design revisions) from South Gloucestershire Council to construct the facility on 70 acres of grassland in Washingpool Farm, Easter Compton, 1.4 miles from Cribbs Causeway and 7 miles from Bristol City Centre. This plot is part of the Avon Forest conservation area and close to the Severn Estuary.

The Wave Bristol opened in October 2019 receiving awards from the British Construction Industry and Green Business Leaders for construction, sustainability and leisure. The kite-shaped surfing lake is 180 metres long, 200 metres wide and approximately 1.5 metres deep with varied bathymetry to dictate wave breaking points and wave morphology. The surfing lake contains 26 million litres of water and is divided into two parts for left breaking and right breaking waves, separated by a pontoon which houses the wave-making system. This is a machine-based modular technology patented as Wavegarden Cove and designed to replicate water particle movement of ocean groundswells to generate waves.

The technology used at The Wave Bristol is different to Surf Snowdonia opened in Wales in 2015 where waves are generated by an underwater foil and drive system, also designed by Wavegarden and patented as Wavegarden Lagoon. The Wave London is currently in development in Lee Valley Regional Park and planned for 2023.

Hounsfield is a Director of English and British Surfing and has worked with the British and English Surf Teams for the annual ISA World Surfing Games and annual ISA World Para Surfing Championships. He is director for Surfing England and Chair of the Board of Directors. In 2019, Hounsfield joined the UK Sport International Leadership Programme to represent British Surfing. Hounsfield has overseen surfing's first funding from UK Sport to invest in the Olympic and Paralympic Games.

Hounsfield has been an activist for the emerging field of ‘blue health’, exploring how the body and the mind responds to being in or near water. Marine social scientist Easkey Britton collated the research of 33 studies featuring more than 2,000 people to evidence support of water-based healthcare and blue health. Britton, Hounsfield and Wallace Nichols (author of Blue Mind) have been among a number of academics and surfers describing the positive sensation of water for the body and mind.

In 2020, Hounsfield spearheaded a partnership between The Wave and The Wave Project to begin a surf-therapy pilot for children aged eight to 18 in the greater Bristol area who suffer from poor mental health. The Wave Project founder Joe Taylor explained how the sessions are designed to build confidence, self-esteem and resilience. The program was first made available on NHS prescription in May 2019 for children in Devon and Cornwall after a pilot project that began in 2010. In 2018 an independent report revealed that the courses “consistently improved the wellbeing of young people” and “had a lasting, positive impact.”

In February 2020, Hounsfield suffered multiple strokes that affected his speech. This, however, by his own admission built his resilience.

Awards and honours 
Hounsfield was voted one of the UK's “Most Disruptive Entrepreneurs” by The Daily Telegraph in 2014 across fields of technology, finance, retail, sport and manufacturing. In 2015 Hounsfield featured in Business West as one of “9 young entrepreneurs nailing the start-up scene in the South West”. In 2018, Hounsfield was listed in the Business Leaders Top 50 Southwest Entrepreneurs, featuring leaders who have had a positive economic impact in the South West UK. Business Leader described Hounsfield's “relentless vision to create an inland surfing destination” that “has seen the business attract millions of pounds in investment.”

In 2020, The Wave Bristol was awarded the Civils Project of the Year for Excellence In Construction in the South West UK. The Wave Bristol was also awarded the Cultural & Leisure Project of the Year at the British Construction Industry Awards and the Michelmores Property Awards. Further in 2020, The Wave Bristol was awarded Green Building Project of the Year at the Business Green Leaders Awards. The richest award, or reward of all, however, is the pleasure of the experience that many, many participants have taken away from their trips to The Wave Bristol.

References

Living people
1973 births
Surfers